The Hempfield Railroad was chartered May 15, 1850 and was a line that originally was to run from Wheeling, West Virginia to Greensburg, Pennsylvania for a distance of 76 miles.

History
The railroad reached Washington, Pennsylvania in the year 1857. It opened for business in 1857 under the heading of Wheeling, Pittsburgh and Baltimore Railroad. The railroad was a Standard gauge railroad (4 ft 8 1/2 inches) and track was 60 pounds to the yard

In the 1868–1869 years the railroad was operating from Wheeling W. Va. to Washington, PA for a distance of 32 miles. It had 3 locomotives, 6 passenger and freight cars including 11 coal cars for a total of 17 cars.
Offices were located Washington, Washington County, Pennsylvania.

Operations to October 31, 1867 were as follows; Gross: $52,198.00 Expenses: $53,357.00 For a loss of $1,159.00

Capital stock: $1,809,565 6 per cent bonds: $500,000 floating debt: $100,000 Cost to build the road: $1,657,799 All of the above reference

The company was bought by the B&O Railroad on May 1, 1871.
The company was reorganized as the Wheeling, Pittsburg, and Baltimore on May 3, 1871 by the B&O.
It was originally to connect with the Pittsburg and Connellsville Railroad (another B&O company) at Newton, Pennsylvania after the reorganization.

See also
 Baltimore and Ohio Short Line Railroad

References

Defunct Pennsylvania railroads
Defunct West Virginia railroads
Railway companies established in 1850